Anepsion is a genus of orb-weaver spiders first described by Embrik Strand in 1929.

Species
 it contains seventeen species:
Anepsion buchi Chrysanthus, 1969 – New Guinea, Solomon Is.
Anepsion depressum (Thorell, 1877) – China, Myanmar to Indonesia (Sulawesi)
Anepsion d. birmanicum (Thorell, 1895) – Myanmar
Anepsion fuscolimbatum (Simon, 1901) – Malaysia
Anepsion hammeni Chrysanthus, 1969 – New Guinea
Anepsion jacobsoni Chrysanthus, 1961 – Indonesia
Anepsion japonicum (Bösenberg & Strand, 1906) – China, Thailand, Japan
Anepsion maculatum (Thorell, 1897) – Myanmar
Anepsion maritatum (O. Pickard-Cambridge, 1877) – India, Sri Lanka, China to Indonesia (Sulawesi)
Anepsion peltoides (Thorell, 1878) – Australia, New Guinea, Papua New Guinea (Bismarck Arch.)
Anepsion reimoseri Chrysanthus, 1961 – New Guinea
Anepsion rhomboides (L. Koch, 1867) – Samoa
Anepsion roeweri Chrysanthus, 1961 – Taiwan, Philippines, Papua New Guinea (Riouw Is.)
Anepsion semialbum (Simon, 1880) – New Caledonia
Anepsion villosum (Thorell, 1877) – Indonesia (Sulawesi)
Anepsion wichmanni (Kulczyński, 1911) – New Guinea
Anepsion wolffi Chrysanthus, 1969 – Solomon Is.

References

Araneidae
Araneomorphae genera
Spiders of Asia
Taxa named by Embrik Strand